K76 or K-76 may refer to:

K-76 (Kansas highway), a state highway in Kansas
Symphony, K. 76 (Mozart)
HMS Orchis (K76), a former UK Royal Navy ship